Régime sans pain is a 1985 French musical fantasy film directed by Chilean filmmaker Raúl Ruiz.

Cast
 Anne Alvaro as Alouette
 Olivier Angèle as Jason
 Gérard Maimone as Professeur Pie
 Gilles Arbona
 Marc Betton
 Jean-Marie Boëglin
 David Bursztein
 Jean-Noël Cassara
 Philippe Morier-Genoud
 Annie Perret
 Marie-Paule Trystram
 Jacques Wenger

References

External links

1985 films
1985 fantasy films
1980s French-language films
French fantasy films
Films directed by Raúl Ruiz
French avant-garde and experimental films
1980s avant-garde and experimental films
1980s French films